Chad Poarch (born December 30, 1997) is an American soccer player who currently plays for Charlotte Independence in the USL Championship.

Career
Poarch played college soccer at High Point University in 2016, before transferring to the University of Delaware in 2017. Poarch left college early to pursue a professional career.

In 2018 and 2019, Poarch appeared for National Premier Soccer League side West Chester United SC, with all his appearances for the club occurring in their Lamar Hunt US Open Cup fixtures. Poarch also appeared for USL League Two side Reading United AC in 2019, making six appearances for the club.

On September 27, 2019, Poarch joined USL Championship side Charlotte Independence. He made his debut shortly after, starting in a 4-0 win over Hartford Athletic on September 28, 2019.

References

1997 births
Living people
American soccer players
Association football defenders
High Point Panthers men's soccer players
Delaware Fightin' Blue Hens men's soccer players
Reading United A.C. players
Charlotte Independence players
Soccer players from Delaware
National Premier Soccer League players
USL League Two players
USL Championship players
People from Middletown, Delaware